Ceratinops is a genus of North American dwarf spiders that was first described by Nathan Banks in 1905.

Species
 it contains ten species:
Ceratinops annulipes (Banks, 1892) (type) – USA
Ceratinops carolinus (Banks, 1911) – USA
Ceratinops crenatus (Emerton, 1882) – USA
Ceratinops inflatus (Emerton, 1923) – USA
Ceratinops latus (Emerton, 1882) – USA
Ceratinops littoralis (Emerton, 1913) – USA
Ceratinops obscurus (Chamberlin & Ivie, 1939) – USA
Ceratinops rugosus (Emerton, 1909) – USA
Ceratinops sylvaticus (Emerton, 1913) – USA, Canada
Ceratinops uintanus Chamberlin, 1949 – USA

See also
 List of Linyphiidae species

References

Araneomorphae genera
Linyphiidae
Spiders of North America
Taxa named by Nathan Banks